Chandler Carlton Riggs (born June 27, 1999) is an American actor and DJ,  best known for his regular role as Carl Grimes on the AMC horror-drama television series The Walking Dead (based on the comic book series of the same name) from 2010 to 2018. For his work on the series, Riggs won three Saturn Awards from five nominations and a Young Artist Award from three nominations.

Riggs has appeared in the films Get Low (2009), Mercy (2014), Keep Watching (2017),  Only (2019), and Inherit the Viper (2019). In late 2017, Riggs started releasing electronic music under his stage name, Eclipse. In early 2019, he began recurring on the ABC drama series A Million Little Things.

Early life
Riggs was born on June 27, 1999 in Atlanta, Georgia to Gina Ann (née Carlton) and William Riggs. Riggs studied tap dancing for several years with So You Think You Can Dance finalist Zack Everhart.

Career

Beginnings
Riggs began acting at age four. His early work included stage productions of The Wizard of Oz, where he played a Munchkin in his theater debut, and Oklahoma with Theater of the Stars at Atlanta's Fox Theatre. At age five, he starred in the indie horror film Jesus H. Zombie. At age nine in 2009, he was cast in his first two feature film roles in Get Low as Tom and in the television film The Wronged Man as seven-year-old Ryan Gregory. The latter film, which aired on Lifetime in 2010, saw Riggs acting opposite Julia Ormond as her son.

The Walking Dead

In 2010 at age 10, Riggs was cast as Carl Grimes, his biggest role to date, on the AMC horror-drama television series The Walking Dead, which is based on the eponymous comic book series. Riggs had previously worked with the series' executive producer Gale Anne Hurd on The Wronged Man. The series follows Rick Grimes (Andrew Lincoln), the father of Riggs' character Carl, as he and his group of family, friends, and strangers fight to survive in a violent apocalyptic world populated with zombies and the few surviving humans, some of whom are even more dangerous than the zombies themselves. Proving to be a ratings success, the series became the #1 show in all of television among adults 18-49.

Riggs and the other main cast members of The Walking Dead won the 2012 Satellite Award for Best Cast in a Television Series. For his performance in the series as Carl, Riggs was nominated for the Saturn Award for Best Performance by a Younger Actor in a Television Series five consecutive times and won the award three times in 2014, 2016, and 2018. In 2014, Riggs also won a Young Artist Award for Best Performance in a TV Series - Leading Young Actor after previously being nominated for the award in 2012 and 2013. Along with several of his co-stars, Riggs lent his voice to a special episode of Robot Chicken titled "The Robot Chicken Walking Dead Special: Look Who’s Walking" in 2017, reprising his role as Carl.

In late 2017, Riggs was let go from The Walking Dead when, in a drastic departure from the comic book source material, his character was controversially killed off midway through the series' eighth season. Riggs' 77th and final episode of the series aired on February 10, 2018.

Further projects
Riggs appeared in the Blumhouse Productions supernatural thriller film Mercy in 2014 and the Voltage Pictures horror film Keep Watching in 2017. In 2017, Riggs started DJing various events around the United States and released his first song "Hold Up" under his stage name "Eclipse" in December of that year. That same month, he was cast in the crime thriller film Inherit the Viper. He played the role of Cooper in the film, which premiered in 2019. He also starred in the science fiction thriller film Only in 2019. In January 2019, Riggs was cast as PJ for a multi-episode arc on the ABC freshman drama series A Million Little Things. Riggs, whose character's full name was revealed to be Patrick Nelson, returned for the series' second season.

Filmography

Film

Television

Awards and nominations

References

External links

1999 births
American male child actors
American male television actors
Male actors from Atlanta
Living people
21st-century American male actors
American male film actors
Twitch (service) streamers